Bay District Schools is a school district headquartered in Panama City, Florida, United States.

The district serves all of Bay County except for Mexico Beach, which is served by Gulf County Schools.

School uniforms
Students at all schools except for students at Margaret K. Lewis School, Shaw Adult Center, Rutherford High School, and Tom P. Haney Technical Center are required to wear school uniforms. Dress code varies between schools.

Schools

PreK-12 schools
Deane Bozeman School 
North Bay Haven Charter Academy 
Palm Bay Preparatory Academy

6-12 Schools
Rutherford High School (Springfield)

High schools
Zoned
J. R. Arnold High School (Panama City Beach)
Bay High School (Panama City)
A. Crawford Mosley High School (Lynn Haven)

Optional
Haney Technical High School (Panama City)
New Horizons Learning Center (Lynn Haven)
Rosenwald High School (Panama City)

PreK-8 Schools
Breakfast Point Academy
Bay Haven Charter Academy 
University Academy

Middle schools
Jinks Middle School
Merritt Brown Middle School
Mowat Middle School
Surfside Middle School (Panama City Beach)

Elementary schools
Callaway Elementary School
Cedar Grove Elementary School
Hiland Park Elementary School
Hutchison Beach Elementary School (Panama City Beach)
Lucille Moore Elementary School
Lynn Haven Elementary School
M. Cherry Street Elementary School
Millville Elementary School
Northside Elementary School
Oakland Terrace Elementary School
Parker Elementary School
Patronis Elementary School (Panama City Beach)
Patterson Elementary School
Southport Elementary School
Springfield Elementary School
St. Andrew Elementary School
Tommy Smith Elementary School
Tyndall Elementary School
Waller Elementary School
West Bay Elementary School

Former
A.D. Harris High School (Panama City)
Everrit Middle School

See also

2010 Panama City school board shootings

References

External links
Bay District Schools

District Schools
School districts in Florida
Panama City, Florida